The Anton Goreczky House in Boise, Idaho, is a -story, Queen Anne house constructed in 1898. The house features a wraparound porch with elaborate brackets, arches, and spandrels.

Anton and Mary Goreczky lived at the Goreczky house from 1898 until Anton Goreczky's death in 1934. Goreczky was a journeyman carpenter and owner of the Boise Sash and Door Factory.

See also
South Eighth Street Historic District

References

External links
 
 Anton Goreczky, History of Idaho: The Gem of the Mountains (S.J. Clarke, 1920), pp 977

		
National Register of Historic Places in Ada County, Idaho
National Register of Historic Places in Boise, Idaho
Queen Anne architecture in Idaho
Houses completed in 1898